Planet Pop may mean:

 Planet Pop, an album by German group ATC
 Planet Pop (1, 2, 3...), a series of pop compilation albums by Sony Music Canada
 Planet Pop, a British music television channel now called Now 90s

See also
 For "planetary population", see world population
 Popworld, UK Channel 4 music programme